Courts of Montana refers to courts of law in the U.S. state of Montana. They include:
;State courts of Montana
Montana Supreme Court
Montana District Courts (56 courts, 22 judicial districts)
Montana Justice Courts
Montana City Courts
Montana Municipal Courts

Montana Youth Courts, Generally assigned to District Court Judges, cases appealed to the Montana Supreme Court.
Montana Worker's Compensation Court
Montana Water Court
Montana Asbestos Claims Court

Federal courts located in Montana
United States District Court for the District of Montana
United States Bankruptcy Court for the District of Montana

References

External links
National Center for State Courts – directory of state court websites.
 

Courts in the United States
Montana state courts